The International Journal of Operations and Production Management is a monthly peer-reviewed academic journal covering all aspects of supply chain management and operations management. It was established in 1980 and is published by Emerald Group Publishing. The editors-in-chief are Constantin Blome  (Lancaster University Leipzig), Robert D. Klassen (Ivey Business School), and Tobias Schoenherr (Michigan State University) and the editorial assistant is Martin C. Schleper (University of Sussex). It is the official journal of the European Operations Management Association.

Abstracting and indexing
The journal is abstracted and indexed in 
Current Contents/Social and Behavioral Sciences, Inspec, ProQuest databases, Social Sciences Citation Index, and Scopus.

References

External links

Business and management journals
Monthly journals
English-language journals
Emerald Group Publishing academic journals
Publications established in 1980